Ciawi is a district (Indonesian: kecamatan) in the Bogor Regency, West Java, Indonesia. It neighbors the city of Bogor to its northwest.

History
When the Bogor Regency was selecting a new regency seat in 1975, Ciawi was considered as an option, but was passed over in favor of Cibinong due to Ciawi being too close to the city proper and may be subject to annexation in the future. Indonesia's first toll road, the Jagorawi Toll Road, was opened in 1978, with Ciawi being its terminus. An extension of the toll road, known as the Bocimi Toll Road, similarly passes through Ciawi, connecting Sukabumi to Bogor.

During 2019, there were plans by the neighboring City of Bogor to annex Ciawi into the city. The regency's government has pushed for the Greater Jakarta LRT to be extended up to Ciawi.

Demographics
Ciawi was found to have a population of 114,853 at the 2020 Census.

Transport
Ciawi possesses a bus terminal serving intercity buses, and is served by a number of Angkot routes.

Administration
The district is subdivided into 13 villages. All of Ciawi's villages are considered "urban" by Statistics Indonesia as per the 2010 census. This district is not to be confused with the similarly-named Ciawi district of Tasikmalaya Regency.

References

Districts of Bogor Regency